Johnny Beauchamp (March 23, 1923 – April 17, 1981) was an American NASCAR driver from Harlan, Iowa. He is best known for finishing second in the 1959 Daytona 500 in a photo finish after being declared the unofficial winner. In 23 starts, he had ten top 10 finishes, seven top 5 finishes, and two victories.

Racing career
Beauchamp began racing old model stock cars at local county fair tracks after World War II. In 1949, Beauchamp teamed up with mechanic Dale Swanson to earn several wins, racing hotrods in Iowa, Nebraska, and elsewhere. He raced unmodified old model stock cars at the Playland Park track in Council Bluffs, Iowa, finishing second in season points behind Tiny Lund.  In 1951, Beauchamp won five straight features at the Playland track and was season champion.  In 1954, he once again was season champion at the Playland track.  He began occasionally racing late models in 1953, and, midway through the 1955 season, Beauchamp began racing in the International Motor Contest Association (IMCA).  At the time, the IMCA was one of the major racing associations in the midwest and a counterpart to the southeastern NASCAR racing organization.  In 1956, driving a Dale Swanson-owned Chevrolet, Beauchamp won an unprecedented 38 IMCA races, while Chevrolets won approximately five races in the NASCAR racing association. He repeated as IMCA champion in 1957, winning the award for top stock car driver of the season. Also in 1957, mechanic Dale Swanson was hired by Chevrolet to help build race cars at its semi-secret shop, SEDCO, in Atlanta, for the 1957 February Daytona Beach race. Beauchamp finished second in the beach race, and was the only car on the same lap as the winner Cotton Owens.

In 1959 another excellent mechanic from Playland and IMCA competition, Roy Burdick, was offered by Holman-Moody, a well-known center of Ford racing, to buy a Thunderbird for $5500 to enter in the first Daytona 500. Burdick agreed and asked Beauchamp to drive the car.  Beauchamp found himself leading the race when Fireball Roberts went out on lap 43.  For the remainder of the race, Beauchamp raced near the front, usually in the top three. On lap 149, Lee Petty, who had been too far back in the pack to be noticed, suddenly appeared driving side by side with Beauchamp.  For the last fifty laps, the two continued racing close together.  Beauchamp eventually crossed the finish line at about the same time as Petty. Beauchamp was declared the unofficial winner of the race, so he drove the Roy Burdick-owned car to victory lane. Petty protested the win. "I had him by two feet," Beauchamp said. "I glanced over to Lee Petty's car as I crossed the finish line and I could see his headlight slightly back of my car. It was so close I didn't know how they would call it, but I thought I won." NASCAR founder Bill France Sr. studied photographs and newsreels for three days before declaring Petty the official winner. Beauchamp competed in seven events that season; recording his first NASCAR victory at Atlanta's Lakewood Speedway where he lapped the entire field.  Although he had several high finishes in 1959, his final points of the season are not listed in the record books.

Beauchamp and his owner-mechanic Roy Burdick were certain they won the first Daytona 500, and their belief had nothing to do with the photo finish.  Instead, they believed Lee Petty was one or two laps behind.  The Petty pit was close to the Beauchamp pit, and the Burdick crew believed Petty had made several more pit stops than Beauchamp.  Petty, as Beauchamp and Burdick learned, had somewhat of a pattern of winning races when drivers and officials believed he was a lap behind: Concord 1958, Daytona 1959, Atlanta 1959, and Weaverville, 1960.  Burdick and Beauchamp believed NASCAR had a lap counting (known as scoring) problem, and part of the problem was that NASCAR had the drivers' wives counting the laps.

In 1960, he raced for Holman-Moody and Dale Swanson in eleven events. He won his second and final NASCAR race that year in a 400-mile event at Nashville Speedway USA. Beauchamp and Petty were involved in an accident at the 1961 Daytona 500 Qualifier #2. Leader Banjo Matthews lost control of his car, spinning in front of the field. Petty and Beauchamp's cars sailed out of turn four and landed outside of the racetrack. It proved to be Beauchamp's last NASCAR race; though he only suffered head and back injuries.

In 1966, Beauchamp was the track champion in Peoria, Illinois.

Motorsports career results

NASCAR
(key) (Bold – Pole position awarded by qualifying time. Italics – Pole position earned by points standings or practice time. * – Most laps led. ** – All laps led.)

Grand National Series

Daytona 500

References

External links
 

1923 births
1981 deaths
NASCAR drivers
People from Harlan, Iowa
Racing drivers from Iowa